Milson Hunt (1926–1988) was a Welsh professional rugby league footballer who played in the 1950s.

Background
Milson Hunt was born in the Cardiff district of Wales in 1926.

International honours
Hunt won a cap for Wales, while at Cardiff, on 1 Dec 1951 in the 1950–51 European Rugby League Championship match v Other Nationalities; scoring a try in the 11-22 defeat.

Death
Hunt died in Aberdeen, Scotland in 1988, at the age of 62.

References

1926 births
1988 deaths
Cardiff RLFC players
Rugby league players from Cardiff
Rugby league wingers
Wales national rugby league team players
Welsh rugby league players